Hermann August Grunder (born December 4, 1931) is a Swiss-American nuclear and accelerator physicist. Dr. Hermann A. Grunder was the founding director of Thomas Jefferson National Accelerator Facility and a Director Emeritus of Argonne National Laboratory.

Biography 
Born 4 December 1931 in Basel, Switzerland, Hermann August Grunder has been a very vocal advocate for the sciences especially within the U.S. Department of Energy, having worked for multiple labs during his estimated forty years within the National Laboratory system. Dr. Grunder obtained his Master's Degree in Engineering from the Kalrsruhe Institute of Technology (Germany) in 1958 and in 1967 earned his doctorate in experimental nuclear physics from the University of Basel. He entered the National Laboratory system in 1959 beginning at the Lawrence Berkeley National Laboratory. From 1968 he was in the accelerator department. In 1979, he became the associate director and head of the departments for accelerators and nuclear fusion. Dr. Grunder spent a cumulative 17 years (approximately) with the Lawrence Berkeley National Lab, moving on to the Directorship of the up-and-coming Thomas Jefferson National Accelerator Facility from 1985 - 2000. Dr. Hermann A. Grunder was the first Director of Thomas Jefferson National Accelerator Facility and had a literal hand in its formation and construction. In 2000, he accepted the directorship of the National Lab system's oldest lab: Argonne. It was from this lab that he retired in 2005.

Honors and awards 
In 1979, Dr. Hermann A. Grunder received the U.S. Senior Scientist Award presented by the Alexander von Humboldt Foundation. In 1980 he became a Fellow of the American Physical Society. In February 1996, received the Distinguished Associate Award presented by the U.S. Department of Energy.

In 2018, Dr. Hermann A. Grunder was awarded the IEEE NPSS Particle Accelerator Science and Technology (PAST) Award for his outstanding contributions to the development of particle accelerator science and technology.

He received honorary doctor degrees from eight universities, including Goethe University Frankfurt.

References 

1931 births
Living people
Scientists from Basel-Stadt
Swiss emigrants to the United States
Argonne National Laboratory people
University of Basel alumni
Swiss physicists
20th-century American physicists
Fellows of the American Physical Society